Nuevos is Orquesta El Arranque's sixth album. Its sixteen tracks are a tribute to the new generation of tango composers. It forms a triptych with the two former albums, Clásicos, a collection of tango classics, and Maestros, which featured the compositions of the intermediate generation of tango composers.

There are two versions of the album: a plain one with an acrylic case and a lyrics booklet and a deluxe version with a board game that is a cross between Trivial Pursuit and snakes and ladders.

It received a nomination for the Premios Gardel in 2009.

Track listing

Personnel
Camilo Ferrero (First Bandoneon)
Ramiro Boero (Second Bandoneon)
Guillermo Rubino (First Violin)
Osiris Rodríguez (Second Violin)
Martín Vázquez (Electric Guitar)
Ignacio Varchausky (Double Bass)
Ariel Rodríguez (Piano)
Noelia Moncada (voice)

References

2008 albums
Orquesta El Arranque albums